Kaitlin Shea Sandeno (born March 13, 1983) is an American former competition swimmer who is an Olympic gold medalist, world champion and former world record-holder.  Sandeno was a member of the American team that set a new world record in the 4×200-meter freestyle relay at the 2004 Summer Olympics. She is the current general manager of DC Trident which is a part of the International Swimming League.

Career

At the 2000 Summer Olympics in Sydney, Australia, Sandeno won the bronze medal in the 800-meter freestyle event, along with fourth place in the 400-meter individual medley and sixth place in the 200-meter butterfly.  In 2003, while enrolled at the University of Southern California, she won the U.S. national championship in the 200-meter butterfly, and the 200- and 400-meter individual medley events.

The 2004 Summer Olympics in Athens, Greece saw Sandeno win three more Olympic medals: a silver medal in the 400-meter individual medley, a bronze medal in the 400-meter freestyle, and a gold medal in the 4×200-meter freestyle relay.  The American team of Natalie Coughlin, Carly Piper, Dana Vollmer and Sandeno also broke the seventeen-year-old world record (previously held by East Germany) by more than two seconds with their victory in the 4×200-meter freestyle relay.

After failing to qualify for the 2008 U.S. Olympic Team, Sandeno announced her retirement.  She is currently looking to start a new career in sports broadcasting.  As of May 2010, Sandeno has joined with Think Physical Therapy and started a venture called Swim Tank where she will do stroke analysis for swimmers. For the 2010 Southern California swim season, Sandeno was an assistant swim coach at Mater Dei High School, a private catholic high school in Santa Ana, California.  As a high school student, Sandeno attended El Toro High School in Lake Forest.

In 2014, Sandeno called the swimming races at the Youth Olympics on NBC.

At USA Swimming 2016 Olympic Trials in Omaha, Nebraska; Sandeno served as the on-deck live emcee alongside Olympic teammate Brendan Hansen. She also hosted USA Swimming’s web-series debut of “Deck Pass Live”.

In April 2018, Sandeno joined swimming fin company Laguna Fin Co. as partner and face of the company. Laguna Fin Co. produces a unique training fin with a built-in neoprene foot pocket for comfort and an adjustable back strap for sizing. This training fin is also the only fin which can be used for all 4 competitive strokes, including breaststroke.

In the Summer of 2019, Sandeno released “Golden Glow. How Kaitlin Sandeno achieved Gold in the Pool and Life” with coauthor Dan D’Adonna.

Personal life
At a younger age, Sandeno swam for the Nellie Gail Saddleback Valley Gators in Orange County, California, coached by Vic and Renee Riggs. She swam as one of the top competitors in freestyle events, and helped the Gator team.

Originally from Lake Forest, Sandeno attended El Toro High School in Lake Forest, California and was a member of the El Toro High School swim team.

In September 2008, Sandeno teamed up with Anna Kournikova and Katya Myers to win the female celebrity category of the 2008 Malibu Triathlon.

On April 25, 2015, Sandeno married Peter Hogan. The couple resides in Newport Beach, California.

Kaitlin appeared on the TV series The Hustler in 2021.

See also

 List of Olympic medalists in swimming (women)
 List of World Aquatics Championships medalists in swimming (women)
 Pan American Games records in swimming
 World record progression 4 × 200 metres freestyle relay

References

External links
 
 
 
 

1983 births
Living people
American female butterfly swimmers
American female freestyle swimmers
American female medley swimmers
World record setters in swimming
Medalists at the FINA World Swimming Championships (25 m)
Olympic bronze medalists for the United States in swimming
Olympic gold medalists for the United States in swimming
Olympic silver medalists for the United States in swimming
Sportspeople from Mission Viejo, California
Swimmers at the 1999 Pan American Games
Swimmers at the 2000 Summer Olympics
Swimmers at the 2004 Summer Olympics
USC Trojans women's swimmers
World Aquatics Championships medalists in swimming
Medalists at the 2004 Summer Olympics
Medalists at the 2000 Summer Olympics
Pan American Games gold medalists for the United States
Pan American Games medalists in swimming
Universiade medalists in swimming
Universiade gold medalists for the United States
Medalists at the 2007 Summer Universiade
Medalists at the 1999 Pan American Games
21st-century American women